Astro may refer to:

Entertainment and media 
 Astro (South Korean band), a South Korean boy band
 Astro (UB40) (1957–2021), member of the British reggae band UB40
 Astro (Chilean band), a Chilean indie rock band
 Astro (Japanese band), a Japanese noise music project
 Astro (album), a 2011 album by Chilean band Astro
 "Astro", a song by The White Stripes from their 1999 debut The White Stripes
 Astro (The Jetsons), a dog character in the cartoon The Jetsons

People with the given name
 Astro (rapper) (born 1996), American actor
 Astro de Ogum (born 1957), Brazilian politician
 Astro Teller (born 1970), British computer scientist

Satellites 
 ASTRO (satellite), the Autonomous Space Transport Robotic Operations vehicle, an American technology demonstration satellite
 Project names of astronomy satellites by ISAS (now JAXA)
ASTRO-A or Hinotori (satellite), a solar X-ray astronomy satellite
ASTRO-B or Tenma, an X-ray astronomy satellite
ASTRO-C or Ginga (satellite), an X-ray astronomy satellite
ASTRO-D or Advanced Satellite for Cosmology and Astrophysics (ASCA), an X-ray astronomy satellite
ASTRO-E, and ASTRO-EII or Suzaku (satellite), an X-ray astronomy satellite
ASTRO-F or Akari (satellite), formerly known as IRIS, an infrared astronomy satellite
ASTRO-G or VSOP-2, a canceled radio astronomy satellite project
ASTRO-H or Hitomi (satellite), formerly known as NeXT, an X-ray astronomy satellite

Science and medicine 
 ASTRO (American Society for Radiation Oncology) or its annual conference
 the Arctic Stratospheric Ozone Observatory (AStrO), now the Polar Environment Atmospheric Research Laboratory (PEARL) in Eureka, Canada

 Astronomy
 Astrobiology
 Astrochemistry
 Astro-geodetic methods, a group of important methods in geodesy, satellite techniques and astrometry
 Astrometry
 Astrophysics
 Astropy

 Astronautics

Sports and games
 Astro convention, a contract bridge bidding convention
 Astrodome, a sports venue in Houston, Texas, and the first home of the Houston Astros
 The Houston Astros, a Major League Baseball team

Television services 
 Astro (television), All-Asian Satellite Television and Radio Operator, a Malaysian subscription-based multi-channel satellite TV and radio service 
 Astro MAX, a former personal video recorder service for Astro (Malaysian satellite television)
 Astro Prima Malaysian pay television channel 
 Astro Vaanavil Malaysian pay television channel in Tamil language
 Astro Wah Lai Toi (Astro 華麗台 in Traditional Chinese) a Cantonese television channel, operated by Astro (Malaysia) and HKB (Hong Kong)
 Astro Malaysia Holdings, media holding company

Vehicles 
 Chevrolet Astro, a "mid-size" van
 GMC Astro, a cabover tractor-trailer truck made by GMC from 1968 to 1988
 Astro-Gnome, an American automobile

Other 
 Adobe Flash Player version 10
 Astrology
 Astro (Motorola), used to describe the digital voice radios produced by Motorola
 Astro navigation, celestial navigation, positional astronomy, navigating by the stars
 Astro yogourt, a Parmalat Canada product
 Amazon Astro, a household robot made by Amazon
 Astro Gaming, American manufacturer of gaming peripherals

See also 
 Astra (disambiguation)
 Astro Arena (disambiguation)
 Astros (disambiguation)